Current HIV Research is a peer-reviewed scientific journal focusing on HIV/AIDS research, established in 2003. The journal is edited by Yuntao Wu and is published by Bentham Science Publishers. It has an impact factor of 1.581

Indexing
Current HIV Research is abstracted and indexing in the following databases and publications:

External links

HIV/AIDS journals
Publications established in 2003
Bentham Science Publishers academic journals